Statistics of the Primera División de México for the 1978–79 season.

Overview

Zacatepec was promoted to Primera División.

This season was contested by 20 teams, and Cruz Azul won the championship.

Veracruz was relegated to Segunda División.

Teams

Group stage

Group 1

Group 2

Group 3

Group 4

Results

Group Stage Playoff

Semifinal

Group A

Group A Results

Round 1América 1 - 0 Cruz AzulAtlético Potosino 0 - 2 Toluca

Round 2Cruz Azul 2 - 1 Atlético PotosinoToluca 1 - 0 América

Round 3Atlético Potosino 1 - 2 AméricaToluca 0 - 1 Cruz Azul

Round 4Cruz Azul 2 - 1 AméricaToluca 5 - 0 Atlético Potosino

Round 5Atlético Potosino 2 - 2 Cruz AzulAmérica 3 - 1 Toluca

Round 6América 0 - 1 Atlético PotosinoCruz Azul 1 - 0 Toluca

Group B

Group B Results

Group 2

Round 1U.N.A.M. 1 - 0 ZacatepecMonterrey 0 - 1 U.A.N.L.

Round 2U.N.A.M. 2 - 2 MonterreyU.A.N.L. 2 - 1 Zacatepec

Round 3Monterrey 2 - 1 ZacatepecU.N.A.M. 3 - 0 U.A.N.L.

Round 4Zacatepec 1 - 2 U.N.A.M.U.A.N.L. 1 - 1 Monterrey

Round 5Monterrey 1 - 1 U.N.A.M.Zacatepec 1 - 1 U.A.N.L.

Round 6U.A.N.L. 2 - 0 U.N.A.M.Zacatepec 2 - 2 Monterrey

Final

Cruz Azul won 2-0 on aggregate.

References
Mexico - List of final tables (RSSSF)

Liga MX seasons
Mex
1978–79 in Mexican football